Agüero Street is an artery road of the City of Buenos Aires and crosses the neighborhoods of Recoleta and Balvanera.

Overwiew 
The street starts in Rivadavia Avenue, Balvanera, where it crosses the Sarmiento commuter rail line 500 meters from the Once railway station.

It is the entrance of  the Abasto Shopping centre and  Line  Agüero station of the Buenos Aires Underground.
The road ends at the Recoleta neighborhood as it crosses Avenida del Libertador.

External links
 Estación Agüero
 Página web del Shopping Abasto

Balvanera
Streets in Buenos Aires